K251AU is an FM translator radio station that serves the Albuquerque, New Mexico area. It broadcasts at 98.1 MHz with a 165 watt signal from atop Sandia Crest, sending a somewhat strong signal into much of the city.  Its studios are located in Northeast Albuquerque.

Currently this translator is re-broadcasting programming from the HD2 subchannel of KBQI (107.9 FM).

History
K251AU began broadcasting in January 2007 with programming from KBNM-LP (98.7 FM), a low-powered radio station based in Belen, New Mexico offering a non-commercial oldies music format. At the time, the translator was running at just 10 watts, and often encountered interference problems with the full-powered KBAC out of Las Vegas, New Mexico. There were also times when the station would be on air with no programming. In April 2013, Clear Channel Communications purchased K251AU from Maria Candelaria for $170,000. At that time it also applied for a construction permit to upgrade the signal to 165 watts. On June 17, 2013 the upgraded signal went on the air stunting with a Christmas music format as "Santa 98.1". On June 21, 2013, K251AU became the new home for the classic country format that had previously aired on KABQ-FM (104.7 FM) since May 2, 2009.

On June 30, 2016, K251AU and KBQI-HD2 rebranded as "98.1 The Bull".

Former logo

References

External links

Classic country radio stations in the United States
Radio stations established in 2007
251AU
IHeartMedia radio stations